Starrett is a surname. Notable people with the surname include:
Charles Starrett (1903–1986), American actor
Helen Ekin Starrett (1840–1920), American educator, author, suffragette
Jack Starrett (1936–1989), American actor and film director
Keith Starrett (born 1951), United States federal judge
Laroy S. Starrett (1836–1922), businessman and inventor
Paul Starrett (1866–1957), American builder
Priscilla Hollister Starrett (1929–1997), American herpetologist
Vincent Starrett (1886–1974), American writer and newspaperman
William A. Starrett (1877–1932), America builder of skyscrapers, built the Empire State Building

See also
L. S. Starrett Company, American manufacturer of tools and instruments
Starrett & van Vleck specialized in the design of early 20th century department stores primarily in New York City
Starrett City, Brooklyn, housing development in Brooklyn, New York City
Starrett City Associates, group of investors that built and owned the Starrett City housing complex
Starrett Corporation, general investment company which incorporated in Dover, Delaware, in February 1929; constructors of the Empire State Building and several housing complexes, including Starrett City, in New York City
Starrett-Lehigh Building a full-block freight terminal, warehouse and office building in the Chelsea neighborhood of Manhattan, New York City